Sarab (also Romanized as Sarāb; also known as Sarāb Bīd Sorkh and Sarāb Şaḩneh) is a village in Sahneh Rural District, in the Central District of Sahneh County, Kermanshah Province, Iran. At the 2006 census, its population was 310, in 82 families.

References 

Populated places in Sahneh County